The Coast University, also called Unicosta, is a private university based in the city of Barranquilla, Atlántico, Colombia. It was founded in 1970 by a business group led by Rodrigo Niebles De La Cruz, Eduardo Crissien Samper, Ramiro Moreno Noriega, Miguel Antequera Stand, Rubén Maury Pertuz, Nulvia Borrero and María Ardila de Maury.

The university offers degrees in industrial, systems, civil, ambiental, electrical and electronic engineering. Other degrees include, business administration, law, psychology, international business, architecture, among others. In total, the university offers 23 undergraduate programs, 39 professional specialization programs, 11 master's programs, and 3 doctoral programs. The university also offers some programs in Sabanalarga, Cartagena, Montería, Pasto and Villavicencio.

The Coast University is one of the most important cultural and technological centers in Barranquilla.

See also

 List of universities in Colombia

References

External links

 Coast University Official web site.

Educational institutions established in 1970
Universities and colleges in Colombia
1970 establishments in Colombia